Andrew Jackson Houston (June 21, 1854June 26, 1941) was an American politician. He was a son of the famous Texas hero and statesman Sam Houston and his wife Margaret Lea Houston, and was named for his father's mentor Andrew Jackson.  He served briefly as a United States senator in 1941, appointed to temporarily fill the vacancy left by the death of longtime Senator Morris Sheppard.

Early life
Andrew J. Houston was born in Independence, Texas, on June 21, 1854. He was educated at several military academies and colleges, including Baylor University and West Point—a member of the Class of 1875, he dropped out before graduating. He studied law and was admitted to the bar in 1876.

Career
Houston had a varied career, including serving as clerk of the federal court in Dallas, a colonel in the Texas National Guard and United States Marshal for the eastern district of Texas.

Houston ran unsuccessfully for Governor of Texas in 1892 as a lily-white Republican candidate.

During the Spanish–American War Houston raised and organized a cavalry troop which was mustered into service as part of the Rough Riders. In 1910 and 1912 he was a Prohibition Party candidate for Governor.

A longtime resident of La Porte, in 1918 he retired to study and write history. From 1924 until his Senate appointment he held a sinecure as Superintendent of the state park at the San Jacinto battleground, where his father had won the battle which led to the independence of Texas from Mexico.

United States senator 

Houston's semi-retirement ended in 1941, when John Morris Sheppard died while representing Texas in the United States Senate.

Texas Governor W. Lee O'Daniel desired to serve in the Senate, but knew it would be politically unpopular to name himself as the interim appointee pending a special election for the remainder of Sheppard's term.  Certain that the 86-year-old Houston would not run in the special election, O'Daniel appointed him to temporarily fill the vacancy.  At the time of his swearing in, 82 years after his father had served in the same seat, Houston was the oldest man to enter the Senate. (The oldest person was Rebecca Latimer Felton).

Houston joined the Senate as a Democrat, and filled the seat from April 21, 1941, until his death.  The early June trip from Texas to Washington, D.C., to begin his duties had a negative effect on Houston's health, and he attended only one committee meeting as a senator, afterwards spending most of his time hospitalized.

Death and burial
Houston died in a Baltimore, Maryland, hospital on June 26, 1941, five days after his 87th birthday.  Houston was briefly interred at Abbey Mausoleum in Arlington County, Virginia. He was later disinterred and reburied in the Texas State Cemetery.

Legacy
In the special election held a few days after Houston's death, O'Daniel defeated Lyndon B. Johnson and several other candidates, and won the seat.

Houston is one of 4 Senators (the others being William Johnson, Edmund Pettus and Strom Thurmond) to be the oldest living U.S. senator while serving and he is the only Senator subsequent to the second U.S. Congress to become the oldest living Senator upon entering office.

Family
Houston was married twice; his first wife was Carrie Glenn Purnell of Austin, who died in 1884.  His second wife, Elizabeth Hart Goode of Dallas died in 1907.  Houston was the father of three daughters, Ariadne, Marguerite, and Josephine;  Ariadne and Marguerite largely devoted their adult lives to caring for their father.  Both Ariadne and Marguerite traveled with him to Washington after his Senate appointment, and they were with him when he died.

Houston family tree

See also

 List of United States Congress members who died in office (1900–49)

References

External links

 
 Texas State Cemetery Honored Texans Biography
 Military Maps of the Texas Revolution by Andrew Jackson Houston, hosted by the Portal to Texas History
Andrew Jackson Houston, Late a Senator from Texas, 1944, U.S. Government Printing Office

People from Independence, Texas
Baylor University alumni
United States Military Academy alumni
United States Marshals
Texas Democrats
Burials at Texas State Cemetery
1854 births
1941 deaths
Democratic Party United States senators from Texas
Texas Republicans
Texas lawyers
American male non-fiction writers
Historians from Texas
American militia officers
Sam Houston
Texas Prohibitionists